The Battle of the Boyne is a 1778 historical painting by the Anglo-American artist Benjamin West.  It portrays the Battle of the Boyne which took place in Ireland in 1690. West's depiction of William of Orange on his white horse became the iconic image of liberation from Catholic Ireland; the painting was widely copied and distributed throughout the nineteenth century. The painting itself is at Mount Stewart, Newtownards, Northern Ireland, and is the property of the National Trust.

West and Historicism
West became a celebrated figure for his 1770 work The Death of General Wolfe, which portrayed James Wolfe's death during the fight for Quebec in 1759. His historical paintings brought him to national attention and he became a leading member of the Royal Academy. West was influenced by neoclassicism and attempted to portray scenes that drew an emotional response, rather than being historically accurate.  As a "history painter," he was more concerned with the epic rendition of the narrative rather than with its possible accuracy.   

West's 1778 work portrays the fighting at the Boyne, part of the Williamite War in Ireland (1689–91). The battle was a decisive victory for the Williamites over James II's Jacobite Irish Army, leading to the capture of the Irish capital city Dublin. By the time West made the painting, the Boyne had come to occupy an important position in Irish Protestant culture. The dominant image of the painting is William of Orange crossing the River Boyne. West's portrayal of the King became influential on subsequent images of William, particularly his use of a white horse.

In the bottom right corner, he portrays the death of Marshal Schomberg, the second-in-command of William's army. Schomberg had crossed the Boyne earlier than William and had been killed by Jacobite cavalry in the melee around Oldbridge ford. West transformed Schomberg's chaotic death into a tableau, one that has strong similarities to other heroic death scenes in West's paintings, such as General Wolfe or Horatio Nelson in The Death of Nelson (1806).

Adoption by the Orange Order
Since the 1690s commemorations—state-sponsored and those held by the lower classes—had been held throughout Ireland celebrating key dates in the Williamite War such as the Battle of the Boyne, Siege of Derry and the Siege of Cork. These followed a tradition started in Elizabethan England of celebrating key events in the Protestant calendar. By the 1740s such organizations as the Boyne Club and the Protestant Society, both seen as forerunners to the Orange Order, held parades in Dublin.  As a "history painting, then, West's Battle of the Boyne represented an important moment in time, making it a crucial depiction of an event that was at least anecdotally important, monoscenic depictions of crucial moments in an implied narrative in the ongoing Orangist narrative.

Origin of the painting
In 2011, another original painting of the battle was discovered in a basement of Brownlow House, Lurgan, and testing indicated the painting dates from about the same time as West's 1778 work. Experts conducting the testing and restoration believe the painting was made by a Dutch artist who did not sign his or her work and the piece contains more details than the West painting, suggesting it may even be an earlier production.  The painting was damaged by bullet holes and knife slashes, and approximately 45 percent of the painting had been destroyed.

Reproductions
Since West's painting, several reproductions have been made, mostly line etchings and engravings; these are widely exhibited.  The most prominent of these was made in 1781 by John Hall (Wivenhoe 1739 – London 1797), which can be found at the Wordsworth House, Cumbria.  Versions of West's painting were often reproduced on walls throughout Belfast, although these reproductions are becoming increasingly rare as the walls give way to urban development.

References

Bibliography
 Carlton, Charles. This Seat of Mars: War and the British Isles, 1485–1746. Yale University Press, 2011.
 Cathcart, Rex. Ireland and King Billy: Triumphalism Usage and Abusage. History Today.  July 1988, pp. 41–45. Online edition 2001. Accessed 23 December 2015.

Newsletter: The Pride of Northern Ireland. Restoration of Boyne painting. Friday 03 June 2011. Accessed 23 December 2015.
 Nordstrom, Carolyn. The Paths to Domination, Resistance, and Terror. University of California Press, 1992.

Paintings by Benjamin West
1778 paintings
War paintings
Cultural depictions of William III of England
Paintings in Northern Ireland